Polina Pekhova (born 21 March 1992) is a Belarusian former tennis player. Her career-high WTA rankings are 287 in singles, achieved on 23 July 2012, and 136 in doubles, set on 22 October 2012.

WTA career finals

Doubles: 1 title

ITF Circuit finals

Singles: 1 (0–1)

Doubles: 9 (6–3)

External links

 
 

1992 births
Living people
Belarusian female tennis players
Universiade medalists in tennis
Tennis players from Minsk
Universiade bronze medalists for Belarus
Medalists at the 2013 Summer Universiade
21st-century Belarusian women